Alsop is an unincorporated community in Spotsylvania County in the U.S. state of Virginia. Alsop is located along Shady Grove Road (VA 608) to the west of Spotsylvania Courthouse.

Unincorporated communities in Spotsylvania County, Virginia
Unincorporated communities in Virginia